Şəfibəyli (also, Shafibeili and Shafibeyli) is a village in the Goranboy Rayon of Azerbaijan. The village forms part of the municipality of Hacallı.

References 

Populated places in Goranboy District